Derek Jacobi is an English actor of the stage and screen. Jacobi has received various awards for his work in film, television and the theatre including a Tony Award, two Primetime Emmy Awards, and two Screen Actors Guild Awards.

For his work in theatre Jacobi received two Tony Award nominations winning for his performance in a Broadway revival of William Shakespeare's Much Ado About Nothing in 1985. He also received three Laurence Olivier Award nominations winning twice for Best Actor for his performances for revivals of Cyrano de Bergerac in 1983, and Twelfth Night in 2009. For his work on television he received five British Academy Television Awards winning for Best Actor for I, Claudius in 1976. He also received three Primetime Emmy Award nominations winning twice for his performances in The Tenth Man (1988), and Frasier in 2001. For his work on film he received three Screen Actors Guild Award for Outstanding Performance by a Cast in a Motion Picture nominations, winning twice with the ensemble casts of Gosford Park (2001), and The Kings Speech (2010).

Major associations

BAFTA Awards

Golden Globe Awards

Laurence Olivier Awards

Primetime Emmy Awards

Screen Actors Guild Award

Tony Awards

Theatre Awards

Drama Desk Award

Evening Standard Awards

Critics Awards 

Film

Audio

Honorary

References

External links

 
 
 "Jacobi, Sir Derek (George)", Who's Who 2008, A & C Black, 2008; online edition, Oxford University Press, December 2007. Retrieved 22 October 2008.

Lists of awards received by British actor